"Never Saw a Miracle" is a song by American singer Curtis Stigers, co-written by Stigers with Barry Mann. It was the fourth of the four charting singles released from his eponymous debut LP. The song became an international hit, reaching the British and Canadian top 40. It made a lesser showing on pop charts in the United States. "Never Saw a Miracle" was a bigger adult contemporary hit, reaching number 13 in Canada and number five in the US.

Charts

Weekly charts

Release history

References

External links
 

1992 songs
1992 singles
Arista Records singles
Song recordings produced by Glen Ballard
Songs written by Barry Mann